Canutillo Stadium is stadium in Canutillo, Texas. It is owned and operated by the Canutillo Independent School District and is home of the Canutillo High School Eagles.

History
It was opened to the public in 2005. It has a capacity of around 12,000 and is about 14 miles away from downtown El Paso. It is mainly used for high school football and soccer games it used to be home of the Indios USA. In 2008, CISD added the visitor bleachers which holds an additional 3,000 people. In 2011, CISD added a new blue turf similar to Boise State University. In 2018-2019 the Blue Turf was fully replaced, by new Technologically advanced Blue Turf.
Soccer venues in Texas
Defunct National Premier Soccer League stadiums
High school football venues in Texas
2006 establishments in Texas
Sports venues completed in 2008